The Cock is a  public house in St Albans, Hertfordshire, England.

The grade II listed building dates back to around 1600 and has some timber framing.

References

External links 

Pubs in St Albans
Grade II listed pubs in Hertfordshire
Timber framed buildings in Hertfordshire